Plautilla (died 67 AD) was an early Christian saint, a Roman widow who was by some accounts baptized by Saint Peter and saw the martyrdom of Saint Paul.

See also
 Plautia gens
 List of early Christian saints

References

External links

67 deaths
1st-century Christian martyrs
Italian saints
Year of birth unknown